Northern Rocky Mountains Provincial Park is a provincial park in British Columbia, Canada.  It is located in the north-eastern part of the province, 90 km south-west from Fort Nelson and it is bordered to the north by the Alaska Highway.  Access is mostly done by boat, aircraft, on horseback or by hiking.

At 6,657.1 km2, it is the largest protected area in the Muskwa-Kechika Management Area and the third largest provincial park in British Columbia.  The park borders Stone Mountain Provincial Park to the north-west and Kwadacha Wilderness Provincial Park to the south-west, creating a large contiguous protected area in the Muskwa Ranges of the Canadian Rockies.

Water features 
The area is notable for a range of water features including rivers, streams, waterfalls, rapids, small glaciers and lakes. Its rivers include the Tetsa, Chischa, and Muskwa, and its creeks include the Gathto, Kluachesi, Dead Dog and Chlotapecta.

The largest water features in the area are the upper and lower Tuckodi Lakes , though other lakes such as Kluachesi and Tetsa exist.

Activities and facilities 
A range of activities is welcome, though most opportunities require experience in and knowledge of the wilderness.

See also 
 List of British Columbia Provincial Parks

References

External links 
 BC Parks - Northern Rocky Mountains Provincial Park

Northern Interior of British Columbia
Provincial parks of British Columbia
Parks in the Canadian Rockies
1999 establishments in British Columbia
Protected areas established in 1999